The Department of Foreign Affairs and Trade (DFAT) is the department of the Australian federal government responsible for foreign policy and relations, international aid (using the branding Australian Aid), consular services and trade and investment (including trade and investment promotion Austrade). In 2021, DFAT allocated USD 3.4 billion of official development assistance, equivalent to 0.22% of gross national income.

The head of the department is its secretary, presently Jan Adams. She reports to the Penny Wong, the Minister for Foreign Affairs.

History
The department finds its origins in two of the seven original Commonwealth Departments established following Federation in 1901: the Department of Trade and Customs and the Department of External Affairs (DEA), headed by Harry Wollaston and Atlee Hunt respectively.

The first DEA was abolished on 14 November 1916 and its responsibilities were undertaken by the Prime Minister's Department and the Department of Home and Territories. It was re-established under the same name on 21 December 1921.

Until the Second World War, Australia's status as a dominion of the British Empire in the then British Commonwealth meant its foreign relations were mostly defined by the United Kingdom. During this time, Australia's overseas activities were predominantly related to trade and commercial interests, while its external affairs were concerned mostly with immigration, exploration and publicity. The political and economic changes wrought by the Great Depression and Second World War, and the adoption of the 1931 Statute of Westminster (ratified by Australia in 1942), necessitated the establishment and expansion of Australian representation overseas, independent of the British Foreign Office. Australia began to establish its first overseas missions (outside London) in 1940, beginning with Washington, D.C., and now has a network of over 80 diplomatic (and 22 trade) posts.

The DEA was renamed the Department of Foreign Affairs in 1970. On 24 July 1987, the Department of Foreign Affairs and the Department of Trade were amalgamated by the Hawke Government to form the Department of Foreign Affairs and Trade (DFAT).

In 1994, the Australian Overseas Information Service (AOIS, formerly Australian Information Service) became a branch in DFAT known as the International Public Affairs Branch. In 1996 the branch was dissolved.

In 2005, DFAT became embroiled in the Oil-for-Food Programme scandal after it was revealed it had approved the Australian Wheat Board's (AWB) request allowing it to pay 'trucking charges' to Alia, a Jordanian trucking company with no actual involvement in the trucking of Australian wheat within Iraq. The Cole Inquiry into the AWB was established, however its terms of reference excluded any investigation of the role of DFAT.

Portfolio responsibilities
The functions of the department are broadly classified into the following matters as laid out in an Administrative Arrangements Order issued on 18 September 2013:
External Affairs, including:
relations and communications with overseas governments and United Nations agencies
treaties, including trade agreements
bilateral, regional and multilateral trade policy
international trade and commodity negotiations
market development, including market access
trade and international business development
investment promotion
international development co-operation
diplomatic and consular missions
international security issues, including disarmament, arms control and nuclear non-proliferation
public diplomacy, including information and cultural programs
International expositions
Provision to Australian citizens of secure travel identification
Provision of consular services to Australian citizens abroad
Overseas property management, including acquisition, ownership and disposal of real property
Tourism industry (international)
International development and aid
Development and co-ordination of international climate change policy
International climate change negotiations

Portfolio ministers
Four additional ministers support the Minister for Foreign Affairs in administering the Department, :

 Minister for Trade and Tourism, Senator Don Farrell
 Minister for International Development and the Pacific, Pat Conroy MP
 Assistant Minister for Foreign Affairs, Tim Watts MP
 Assistant Minister for Trade, Senator Tim Ayres

Secretary of the Department
DFAT is administered by a senior executive, comprising a secretary and five deputy secretaries. On the recommendation of the Prime Minister, the Governor-General has appointed the following individuals as Secretary to the department:

Structure
The department is responsible to the Minister for Foreign Affairs, the Minister for Trade, Tourism and Investment, the Minister for International Development and the Pacific, and the Assistant Minister for Trade, Tourism and Investment.

The department has around 3,300 employees, of whom 1,300 are foreign staff employed by missions directly, and 1,500 are Australian employees based in Australia, and some 500 are diplomats serving overseas.

Departmental structure
Office of the Secretary
Internal Audit Branch
Strategic Policy, Contestability and Futures Branch
Executive Branch
Global Cooperation, Development and Partnerships Group
Multilateral Policy Division
Development Policy Division
Multilateral Development and Finance Division
Public Diplomacy, Communications & Scholarships Division
Centre for Health Security
Office of Development Effectiveness
Innovation Xchange
Office of the Ambassador for the Environment
International Security, Humanitarian and Consular Group
International Security Division
Consular and Crisis Management Division
Humanitarian, NGOs and Partnerships Division
Legal Division
Middle East and Africa Division
Australian Safeguards and Non-proliferation Office
Office of the Ambassador for Cyber Affairs
Indo-Pacific Group
South-East Asia Division
North Asia Division
Pacific Division
US and Indo-Pacific Strategy Division
South-West Asia Division
Trade, Investment and Business Engagement Group
Office of Trade Negotiations
Investment and Economic Division
Free Trade Agreement Division
Europe and Latin America Division
Services Delivery Group
People Branches
Diplomatic Academy
Finance Branches
Security Branches
Information Management and Technology Division
Australian Passport Office
Overseas Property Office
Protocol Branch
Contracting and Aid Management Division

Diplomatic network
The department maintains offices in each state and mainland territory to provide consular and passport services, and to perform an important liaison service for business throughout Australia. In addition, it has a Torres Strait Treaty Liaison Office on Thursday Island. Additionally, the department manages a network of over 90 overseas posts, including Australian embassies, high commissions, consulates-general and consulates.

Portfolio agencies
DFAT also manages several agencies within its portfolio, including:
Australian Trade and Investment Commission;
Export Finance and Insurance Corporation;
Australian Secret Intelligence Service;
Australian Centre for International Agricultural Research

DFAT also manages foundations, councils and institutes including:
 Australia-China Council (ACC)
 Australia-India Council (AIC)
 Australia-Indonesia Institute (AII)
 Australia International Cultural Council (AICC)
 Australia-Japan Foundation (AJF)
 Australia-Korea Foundation (AKF)
 Australia-Malaysia Institute (AMI)
 Australia-Thailand Institute (ATI)
 Council for Australian-Arab Relations (CAAR)
 Council on Australia Latin America Relations (COALAR)

See also

 Australian Information Service
 Australian Volunteers for International Development
 Five Nations Passport Group
 List of Australian Commonwealth Government entities
 List of High Commissioners and Ambassadors of Australia

References

External links 
 Department of Foreign Affairs and Trade Website
 National Indigenous Times article on Trent Smith who was dismissed by DFAT then re-employed after lengthy legal proceedings
 OECD Development Co-operation Profile of Australia

 
Foreign Affairs and Trade
Foreign relations of Australia
Australia
Ministries established in 1987
Trade ministries